Tragic Hunt (Italian: Caccia tragica)  is a 1947 Italian drama film directed by Giuseppe De Santis and starring Vivi Gioi, Andrea Checchi and Carla Del Poggio. It was part of the wave of postwar neorealist films. It was one of two produced by the ANPI movement along with The Sun Still Rises from the previous year.

Future filmmakers Michelangelo Antonioni and Carlo Lizzani co-wrote the script. The film's sets were designed by the art director Carlo Egidi.

Plot
After the Second World War, in Emilia-Romagna, Italy, a cooperative has been founded by peasants. War has destroyed the country. A group of bandits, with former Nazi-collaborator Daniela, known as 'Lili Marlene' (Vivi Gioi), holds up the truck where the money of the cooperative is travelling. All the peasants search for the thieves in a tragic hunt.

Cast

Vivi Gioi as Daniela 'Lili Marlene'
Andrea Checchi as Alberto
Carla Del Poggio as Giovanna
Massimo Girotti as Michele
Vittorio Duse as Giuseppe
Checco Rissone as Mimì
Umberto Sacripante as The lame man 
Folco Lulli as A farmer
Michele Riccardini as The maresciallo
Eugenia Grandi as Sultana
Piero Lulli as The driver 
Ermanno Randi as Andrea 
Enrico Tacchetti as The accountant
Carlo Lizzani as The veteran holding a speech

Awards
It won two Nastro d'Argento as Best Director and Best Supporting Actress (Vivi Gioi).

External links 
 

1947 films
Films set in Italy
1940s Italian-language films
Italian black-and-white films
1947 drama films
Social realism in film
Films directed by Giuseppe De Santis
Films with screenplays by Cesare Zavattini
Italian drama films
1947 directorial debut films
1940s Italian films